MEB may refer to:
Marine Expeditionary Brigade
Maneuver Enhancement Brigade, a US Army support formation that is tasked to improve the movement capabilities and rear area security for commanders at division level or higher.
Mario Excite Bike
 Micro Enterprise Bank, see Microcredit, Microfinance
Meb Keflezighi, American long-distance runner
Microscopie électronique à balayage, the French acronym for Scanning electron microscope
Midlands Electricity Board
Muscle-eye-brain disease
 Line B (Rome Metro), Metropolitana B
 Volkswagen Group MEB platform for electric cars by Volkswagen Group
 Ministry of National Education (Turkey)
 Essendon Airport, Melbourne, Victoria, Australia, IATA: MEB
 Laurinburg–Maxton Airport, Maxton, North Carolina, U.S., FAA LID: MEB
 Maria Elena Boschi, Italian politician